Il padrone delle ferriere is a 1959 Italian-Spanish historical melodrama film written and  directed by Anton Giulio Majano. It is based on the novel Le Maître de forges by Georges Ohnet.

Cast 
António Vilar as   Philippe Derblay 
Virna Lisi as Claire de Beaulieu
Wandisa Guida as  Athenaïs de Moulinet
Evi Maltagliati as  Marquise de Beaulieu
Dario Michaelis as  Gaston de Bligny 
Mario Girotti as  Octave de Beaulieu
Cathia Caro as  Suzanne Derblay
Ivo Garrani as  Monsieur Moulinet
Susana Campos as  Sophie de Préfont
Guido Celano  as Gobert 
Riccardo Fellini  as Max de Tremblay

References

External links

Il padrone delle ferriere at Variety Distribution

1959 films
Italian romantic drama films
Films directed by Anton Giulio Majano
Spanish romantic drama films
Films based on French novels
Films based on works by Georges Ohnet
1959 romantic drama films
1950s Italian films